The 2022 New York State Assembly election was held on November 8, 2022. Elections were held to elect representatives from all 150 districts across the State of New York. This election coincided with New York elections for the governorship, U.S. Senate, and state senate, among others. Districts for this election were redrawn following the 2020 United States census. Democrats have held a majority in the New York State Assembly since 1975.

Overview

Incumbents not seeking re-election
Michael Montesano (R) retired.
Brian Barnwell (D) retired.
Catherine Nolan (D) retired.
Michael Cusick (D) retired.
Yuh-Line Niou (D) ran for the U.S. House of Representatives in newly-redrawn 10th congressional district. 
Dan Quart (D) ran for Manhattan's 9th Municipal Court District.
Richard Gottfried (D) retired.
Kevin Byrne (R) is running for Putnam County Executive.
Sandra Galef (D) retired.
Mike Lawler (R) ran for the United States House of Representatives.
Colin Schmitt (R) ran for the United States House of Representatives.
Kieran Michael Lalor (R) retired.
Jake Ashby (R) ran for State Senate.
Mark Walczyk (R) ran for State Senate.
John Salka (R) retired.

Incumbents defeated in primary elections
Jose Rivera (D) lost renomination to George Alverez in District 78
Tom Abinanti (D) lost renomination to Mary Jane Shmisky in District 92
Kevin Cahill (D) lost renomination to Sarahana Shrestha in District 103

Predictions

Assembly Districts 

+Elected in a special election.

Notes

References 

New York State Assembly elections
2022 New York (state) elections
New York Assembly